Nate Creekmore (born October 14, 1982, in Omaha, Nebraska) is an American cartoonist. Nate is a two-time winner of the Scripps College Cartoonist of the Year and an Associated Press award for achievement in college cartooning for Nate's strip Maintaining which appeared in the newspaper The Babbler at Lipscomb University in Nashville.

In May 2007, Maintaining, with Universal Press Syndicate, became nationally syndicated. Universal Press Syndicate offered Creekmore a stipend to spend the next year developing his comic strip which led to its spread across the United States.

Career
Creekmore embraced the way people would deal with his racial background: he found it to be funny and almost amusing.

Maintaining
Creekmore created his entertaining comic strip, "Maintaining" because it shows what it means to be 
"biracial in a society that prefers its people be uniracial".
Creekmore wants his comic to give a different perspective on mixed-race people.
Marcus, the main character in Maintaining, is biracial and goes by the term Halfrican-American and the comic is mostly based on Creekmore's own personal experiences.

References

External links
 Nate Creekmore website
 Maintaining on GoComics

1982 births
Living people
Artists from Omaha, Nebraska
Lipscomb University alumni
American comic strip cartoonists